Sambalpur University Institute of Information Technology (SUIIT) was established in 2010.

History
SUIIT was set up in 2010 as a self-financing institute of Sambalpur University and is the first technical institute which was to be set up in a general university after 2002 in Odisha. SUIIT is the brainchild of former vice-chancellor Prof Arun Pujari. Most of the courses being offered by the SUIIT were pulled out from different existing departments of Sambalpur University. Electronics was taken out of physics department, computer science from mathematics while bioinformatics was pulled out from life sciences department. Only the undergraduate courses newly add in SUIIT. While the state government had given an initial budget of Rs 10 crore in 2009-10 for the institute, Rs 5 crore from Directorate of Distance and Continuing Education (DDCE) was given to it for construction of its buildings inside the varsity.

Location
The present campus of the university is located at Burla, 2 km away from NH 6. The campus of this university is in the vicinity of Mahanadi Coal Fields Limited, VSSUT and located on the foothills of the Hirakud Dam.

Admission
From the year 2017, admissions into the B.Tech. courses will be through OJEE Counselling. Candidates both regular and lateral entry can take admission only through OJEE 2017 Counselling by following appropriate admission procedure. For detail eligibility criteria and admission/counselling procedure, the candidate may refer OJEE website. There is no other way to take admission into B.Tech. programmes. Refund and reservation policy are as per rules.

Academics
Computer Science and Engineering (CSE)
Electrical and Electronics Engineering (EEE)
Electronics and Communication Engineering (ECE)

Hostels
New hostels were inaugurated and started functioning from 1 August 2016 and another new hostel in 2017.

See also
 List of institutions of higher education in Odisha
 IIT Bhubaneswar
 NIT Rourkela
 IIIT Bhubaneswar
 Veer Surendra Sai University of Technology

References

External links
SUIIT Website
Sambalpur University Website

Information technology schools in India
Engineering colleges in Odisha
Universities and colleges in Sambalpur
Universities in Odisha
Educational institutions established in 2010
2010 establishments in Orissa